A microdot is reduced size text or photographic images, compulsory for the identification of cars in South Africa.

Microdot may also refer to:

 Microdot (car), a concept hybrid city car designed by William Towns in 1976
 Microdot (connector), a series of connectors by Tyco Electronics
 Microdot (rapper), a South Korean rapper
 Microdot, a graphic design company founded by Brian Cannon
 A street name for LSD or PMA in pill form
 Printer steganography, a way of encoding printer serial numbers and timestamps